Microsoft 365 Copilot is an Artificial intelligence assistant feature for Microsoft 365 applications and services, which include its productivity suite of programs such as Word, Excel, PowerPoint, and Outlook. The integration of Copilot with 365, announced on March, 16, 2023, is initially available to a small number of enterprises and individuals for testing purposes. Copilot uses OpenAI's GPT-4 large language model with Microsoft Graph to assist users in a range of tasks.

Marketing 
Copilot is being marketed as an added feature to Microsoft 365's emphasis on business productivity. Pricing and licensing details are not yet known.  Copilot has been compared to Microsoft's discontinued "Office Assistant" feature Clippit.

Ethics 
Concerns over the speed of Microsoft's recent release of AI-powered products and investments have led to questions surrounding ethical responsibilities surrounding the testing of such products.

References

External links 

 March 16 announcement on Microsoft's blog
 

Artificial intelligence
Virtual assistants
Microsoft